Yorkletts is a settlement two miles south of Whitstable in Kent in South East England. At the 2011 Census the settlement was included in the Seasalter ward of the City of Canterbury Council, and it is one of the smaller villages in the City of Canterbury.

Yorkletts is home to the large Woodland Trust site, Victory Woods, with views over the North Sea.

References

External links

Villages in Kent